Dermophis parviceps is a species of caecilian in the family Dermophiidae. It is found in Costa Rica and Panama, and possibly in Colombia, depending on the source. Common names slender caecilian and La Loma caecilian have been coined for it.

Description
Specimens from Costa Rica measure  in total length and have 85–102 primary and 11–26 secondary annuli; the annular grooves lack dark pigment seen in Dermophis mexicanus and Dermophis oaxacae. The body is slender. The eyes can be seen through the skin. The head is pinkish, contrasting with the purplish-gray body.

Habitat and conservation
It is probably viviparous and not dependent on water for its reproduction.

D. parviceps can be locally common. It is unknown to which degree deforestation is a threat to it. It is present in many protected areas in Panama and Costa Rica.

References

parviceps
Amphibians of Colombia
Amphibians of Costa Rica
Amphibians of Panama
Taxa named by Emmett Reid Dunn
Amphibians described in 1924
Taxonomy articles created by Polbot